Original Tracks Vol. 1 is the first and only compilation album released by Namie Amuro with Super Monkey's, compiling all the singles A & B sides that were released. This is the last album that the group had recorded together before Namie Amuro going solo with avex trax in 1995 and Minako Inoue, Nanako Takushi, Reina Miyauchi, and Ritsuko Matsuda forming MAX with avex trax in 1995. It also concludes with miscellaneous broadcasting from the actual artist, expressing her thoughts on her life. The album was certified platinum by the RIAJ for 400,000 copies shipped.

In March 2018, Universal Music Japan announced that they will release a remastered version of the album on the SHM-CD format on May 2, 2018.

Track listing
Mister U.S.A. (Super Monkey's)
Koi no Cute Beat (Super Monkey's)
Dancing Junk (Super Monkey's 4)
Rainbow Moon (Super Monkey's 4)
Aishite Masukatto (Super Monkey's 4)
Wagamama wo Yurushite (Super Monkey's 4)
Paradise Train (Namie Amuro with Super Monkey's)
Kanashiki Broken Boy (Namie Amuro with Super Monkey's)
Try me ~watashi wo shinjite~ (Namie Amuro with Super Monkey's)
Memories ~ashita no tame ni~ (Namie Amuro with Super Monkey's)
Taiyo no Season (Namie Amuro with Super Monkey's)
Haato ni hi wo Tsukete (Namie Amuro with Super Monkey's)
Stop the Music (Namie Amuro with Super Monkey's)
Good-night (Namie Amuro with Super Monkey's)

References 

Namie Amuro albums
1996 compilation albums
Universal Music Japan albums